Filles du Calvaire is a station on line 8 of the Paris Métro, named after the Boulevard des Filles du Calvaire.

The station opened on 5 May 1931 with the extension of the line from Richelieu - Drouot to Porte de Charenton. The boulevard was named after the Calvairiennes or Filles du Calvaire (Daughters of Calvary) who were an order of reformed Benedictine sisters. Antoinette d’Orléans and Père Joseph founded the order in Poitiers, in 1617. The convent was later moved to Paris and was closed in the French Revolution.

Station layout

References
Roland, Gérard (2003). Stations de métro. D’Abbesses à Wagram. Éditions Bonneton.

External links

Paris Métro stations in the 3rd arrondissement of Paris
Paris Métro stations in the 11th arrondissement of Paris
Railway stations in France opened in 1931